Piedra Blanca (literally, "White Stone") is a city in Monseñor Nouel province, Dominican Republic.

References

Populated places in Monseñor Nouel Province
Municipalities of the Dominican Republic